America's Marine Highway is a United States Department of Transportation (DOT) initiative, aimed to use the United States'  of navigable waterways to alleviate traffic and wear to the nation's highways caused by tractor trailer traffic.  In 2007 Congress included provisions to Public Law 110-140, to 'Offer a waterborne alternative to available land-side transportation services using documented Vessels' and 'Provide transportation services for passengers or freight (or both) that may reduce congestion on land-side infrastructure using documented vessels.'
As the United States' population grows, its need to transport freight within its borders also grows. This increases the need for fossil fuels and damages the nation's highways. Alongside grassroots efforts to reduce this congestion and greenhouse gas, such as the idea of 'buying local,' the federal government is looking to its navigable waterways to help alleviate the problem.

Research has shown that transporting by barge or ship is the most fuel-efficient method of transporting goods (per Ton-Mile), being over eight times more efficient than tractor-trailers and double what is achievable by rail. It also does not face the transportation limits truckers face in 'hours driving.' A teamster's daily range is also dependent on highway traffic congestion and bottlenecks (such as weigh-stations and toll booths) whereby their daily range could be even less.

History
Waterborne transport has been important to Americans since the settling of Jamestown, when travel between plantation was as likely to be by boat as by road. Until World War II, Texas oil was transported to the East Coast by tanker, when it was replaced by the Big Inch pipeline. The Marine Highway program is MARAD's effort to stimulate low cost, green barges in places where they have not been employed.

Approach to funding

The United States studied Europe's model of Short Sea Shipping, and has taken a different approach to how it will encourage business and shipping lines to return to the nation's intracoastal waterways.  The Secretary of Transportation has identified several heavily congested motorways throughout the US that have an acceptable waterway alternative.  These routes are identified with an 'M' designator, for example: M-5 identifies the coastal alternative to I-5 between San Diego, CA and Seattle, WA.  Once these routes have been identified, state and local government agencies can apply for 'Transportation Investment Generating Economic Recovery' (TIGER) Grants to improve port infrastructure and encourage the use of water-side shipping.  These grants are not intended to 'subsidize' shipping industries, but to improve the size and efficiency of port authorities.  This will encourage shipping lines to make use of the increase in port area, and let the natural economic value of shipping by water encourage local businesses.

With intermodal transit standardized in the U.S., transferring goods with different modes of transport does not require longshoremen or terminal workers to re-pack material.  This leads to a lower chance of product loss or damage.  Many ports have refined the transferring of a container off a truck and onto a container barge or ship into an art form, and can accomplish it in under a minute.

Potential drawbacks

Environmental

For years the United States has had regulations concerning the handling of ballast water for transcontinental shipping.  The goal was to minimize the cross contamination of invasive marine species into virgin waters.  Major Shipping hubs such as the Port of Long Beach, Port of New York and New Jersey, and the Port of Houston have already been contaminated for generations.  Short Sea shipping will use these ports like spokes of a wheel to smaller, easier to access ports, and there are concerns of 'secondary contamination' to these smaller estuaries.

Trucking companies

The Teamsters Union, as of May 2013 has yet to publish a stance on federal backing of this third contender to many shipping markets, MARAD and maritime shipping leaders believe they are helping the Teamsters by moving freight out of areas with low Teamster-to-Cargo Ratios, and in to ports where the ratio is closer to 1:1 or better.  They also believe that the Marine Highway can better handle the nation's north-south transit, though there are no east-west sailing corridors and those will always be land-side transits. 
Truck drivers, under DOT regulation, are limited in the number of hours they are allowed to drive in a day.  These limits do not allow for traffic, waiting to load or unload, or check points.  A ferry, or Roll-on/Roll-off Vessel would allow a driver to keep moving his cargo to its ultimate destination while they take their mandatory off-duty hours.

Small business concerns

The benefit to shipping by truck is convenience.  The teamster who picks up the merchandise is contractually bound to ensure its delivery to the products destination.  Using Short Sea Shipping adds two more legs to the shipping equation.  The first teamster carries the goods from its point of origin to the port authority, from there by barge or ship to the second port authority.  a second teamster then collects the cargo and delivers it to the final destination.  This forces the business owner to either work with a single large trucking company working in both ports, or coordinate with two owner-operators independently, and possibly have the cargo sitting on a pierside holding area until a second trucking contract can be agreed upon.

Anti-cabotage laws
The Merchant Marine Act of 1920, also known as the Jones Act, prohibits foreign ships from carrying cargo or passengers between U.S. ports, a practice called cabotage. Ships that wish to trade between U.S. ports must be built and flagged in the U.S. and have at least three-fourths of their crew-members U.S. citizens or permanent residents. Large container ships that already stop at several ports along the U.S. coasts could move containers between those ports at low cost but for the anti-cabotage laws.

Expanding into the future

The United States Navy is considering the America's Marine Highway as an opportunity to breathe life into their aging Military Sealift Command (MSC) Fleet. Currently, if a national crisis were to take place, the U.S. government would need to rely heavily on foreign support to transport its Armed Forces, much like during Operations Desert Shield, and Desert Storm.  The US Navy entered into a Memorandum of Agreement with MARAD to develop a U.S. built and U.S. manned dual-use vessel to sail in peacetime in trade and to provide a sealift capability during times of National Emergency.

List of routes
Most routes along America's Marine Highway are numbered after a landside highway that it runs parallel to, typically an Interstate Highway.

References

United States Department of Transportation
Waterways in the United States
2007 establishments in the United States